Mirosław Hajdo (born 3 August 1970) is a Polish football manager who is currently in charge of I liga club Resovia.

References

1970 births
Living people
Polish football managers
MKS Cracovia managers
Kolejarz Stróże managers
Kmita Zabierzów managers
Bruk-Bet Termalica Nieciecza managers
Przebój Wolbrom managers
Sandecja Nowy Sącz managers
Motor Lublin managers
Ekstraklasa managers
I liga managers
II liga managers